Vittorio Mari Bonnevie Sotto (born January 12, 1984), known professionally as Oyo Boy Sotto, is a Filipino actor. He is the son of Filipino actor-comedian-host Vic Sotto and Swiss-Filipino singer-actress Dina Bonnevie, nephew of Senator Tito Sotto, younger brother of actress Danica Sotto, half-brother of Pasig City Mayor Vico Sotto and the cousin of Gian Sotto, Ciara Sotto, and the late Miko Sotto.

Personal life
At the age of 3, Sotto joined the fantasy situational comedy in 1987 Okay Ka, Fairy Ko! and the weekly anthologies Lovingly Yours, Helen and Coney Reyes on Camera. At the age of 9, he also joined GMA Telecine Specials in 1993. At age 19, Sotto signed his contract under GMA Artist Center as he joined the cast of Love to Love: Rich in Love and several drama series of GMA Network from 2003 to 2007. In the same year, he transferred to ABS-CBN when he signed a Star Magic contract until 2010 lasted for 3 years. In 2013, Sotto went back to GMA Network after 6 years where he joined the cast of Vampire ang Daddy Ko. On January 12, 2011, he married actress Kristine Hermosa. They have four children: Kristian Daniel (Kiel, born August 16, 2008) and the other is their biological daughter, Ondrea Bliss (born December 26, 2011), and two biological sons Kaleb Hanns (born October 11, 2014) and Marvic Valentin II (Vin, born November 5, 2016). He is a born-again Christian and attending Victory.

Filmography

Television

Film

References

External links

1984 births
Living people
Filipino male child actors
Filipino male film actors
Filipino people of French descent
Filipino people of Italian descent
Filipino people of Swiss descent
Tagalog people
Filipino male television actors
People from Metro Manila
GMA Network personalities
ABS-CBN personalities
Star Magic
TV5 (Philippine TV network) personalities
Oyo Boy